Rickenbacker may refer to:

Eddie Rickenbacker, leading American World War I flying ace, Medal of Honor recipient, head of Eastern Airlines
Rickenbacker (car), an early car produced by Eddie Rickenbacker
Rickenbacker International Airport, Franklin County, Ohio, named in honor of Eddie Rickenbacker
Rickenbacker Air National Guard Base, named in his honor
Rickenbacker Field, original name of Dobbins Air Reserve Base, Marietta, Georgia, honoring Rickenbacker
Rickenbacker Causeway, Florida, also named for him
Rickenbacker International Corporation, guitar manufacturer
Adolph Rickenbacker, co-founder of the company, cousin of Eddie Rickenbacker

German-language surnames